Stan Bunger (born June 8, 1956 in San Francisco, California) is an American broadcast journalist. He was the morning co-anchor at KCBS All News 740 AM/106.9 FM in San Francisco from 2000 until his retirement in 2021. He first joined KCBS in 1982 and served until 1992.

In addition to anchoring the morning newscasts at KCBS radio, Bunger plays rhythm guitar in the Eyewitness Blues Band.

Bunger is a 1973 graduate of Leigh High School in San Jose, California, a 1975 graduate of West Valley College in Saratoga, California, and received his B.A. in 1977 from the Broadcast and Electronic Communication Arts (BECA) Department at San Francisco State University. He was inducted to the Bay Area Radio Hall of Fame in 2010 and to the San Francisco State University Alumni Hall of Fame in 2011.

Bunger’s broadcasting career began in 1977 at KRKC Radio in King City, California. He has also been employed as a broadcast journalist at:
KVML Radio in Sonora, California
KTHO Radio in South Lake Tahoe, California
KXRX Radio in San Jose, California
KNTV Television in San Jose, California
KFBK Radio in Sacramento, California
KRLD Radio in Dallas, Texas
KICU-TV in San Jose, California
KRON-TV in San Francisco, California

References

External links
 Bunger's "KCBS Sports Fans" blog
 Bunger's bio on The Eyewitness Blues Band website

1956 births
Living people
Radio personalities from San Francisco
American radio journalists
West Valley College alumni
San Francisco State University alumni